Pipes is an English surname. Notable people with the surname include:

Alan Pipes (born 1947), English writer and artist 
Ben Pipes (born 1986), British volleyball player
Cam Pipes (born 1977), Canadian musician 
Daniel Pipes (born 1949), American historian and writer
David Pipes (disambiguation), multiple people
Douglas Pipes, American composer
Felix Pipes (1887–?), Austrian tennis player
Greg Pipes (born 1946), American football player
James Pipes (1840–1928), American awarded soldier 
Leah Pipes (born 1988), American actress
Martin L. Pipes (1850–1932), American judge
Richard Pipes (1923–2018), Polish-American historian
Wade Hampton Pipes (1877–1961), American architect
William Thomas Pipes (1850–1909), Canadian politician

See also
Pipes (disambiguation)
Wesley Lawrence (born 1969), American pornographic actor known as Wesley Pipes

English-language surnames